The 1967 Senior League World Series took place from August 14–17 in Des Moines, Iowa, United States. Westbury, New York defeated West Des Moines, Iowa in the championship game. It was New York's second straight championship. This was the final SLWS held in Des Moines.

This year featured the debut of a double-elimination format, as well as the re-introduction of a host team.

Teams

Results

References

Senior League World Series
Senior League World Series
Baseball in Iowa